THIG may refer to:
Sharkula, a Chicago rapper
Thiazole synthase, an enzyme